Jai Newcombe (born 2 August 2001) is a professional Australian rules footballer with the Hawthorn Football Club in the Australian Football League (AFL).

Early career

Growing up in the small rural town of Poowong in Southern Gippsland. Newcombe participated in the Auskick program at Poowong and playing junior football for the Poowong Magpies in the Ellinbank & District Football League. Newcombe was unable to secure a place in the Gippsland Power squads at ages 16, 17 and 18. Newcombe made the team in 2020, but due to the COVID-19 pandemic he was unable to play a game.

Newcombe's AFL career started with playing for  Hawthorn affiliate Box Hill Hawks in the Victorian Football League (VFL). He played a practice match for Box Hill at the start of 2020 and was asked to come back in November after Melbourne was released from lockdown. He made the long commute twice a week from Warragul (where he was working) to training at Box Hill.

AFL career

Newcombe was selected with Pick 2 in the 2021 mid-season draft, having caught the eye of recruiters after building an impressive campaign with the Box Hill Hawks across the first half of the 2021 VFL season. The following week, Newcombe made his AFL debut against the Swans, setting an AFL record for the most tackles in a debut match, with 14.

Statistics
Updated to the end of the 2022 season.

|-
| 2021 ||  || 44
| 7 || 1 || 1 || 32 || 30 || 62 || 17 || 39 || 0.1 || 0.1 || 4.6 || 4.3 || 8.9 || 2.4 || 5.6 || 0
|-
| 2022 ||  || 44
| 22 || 8 || 6 || 266 || 230 || 496 || 94 || 101 || 0.4 || 0.3 || 12.1 || 10.5 || 22.5 || 4.3 || 4.6 || 11
|- class="sortbottom"
! colspan=3| Career
! 29 !! 9 !! 7 !! 298 !! 260 !! 558 !! 111 !! 140 !! 0.3 !! 0.2 !! 10.3 !! 9.0 !! 19.2 !! 3.8 !! 4.8 !! 11
|}

Honours and achievements
Individual
 AFLCA best young player: 2022
  Lethal Award: 2022
 AFL Rising Star nominee: 2022
 VFL Team of the Year: 2021

References

External links

Living people
2001 births
Hawthorn Football Club players
Box Hill Football Club players
Australian rules footballers from Victoria (Australia)
Gippsland Power players